Isolation is a 2005 Irish science fiction horror film directed and written by Billy O'Brien and produced by Film Four and Lions Gate Film Studios. The film was released direct to DVD on 26 June 2007.

Plot 

Dan Reilly, who owns a failing farm in rural Ireland, is being paid by a bio-genetics firm to assist in some experiments to make faster-growing cattle. The firm sends Orla, a local veterinarian, to inspect the cows and ensure the experiment is running smoothly. While performing a palpation, Orla is seemingly bitten by the unborn calf. She informs John, a genetic scientist from the firm, but he dismisses her concerns. John also informs Dan of a caravan parked near his farm and reminds him that the experiment is supposed to be kept secret from the public. Dan goes out and speaks to the inhabitants, traveller Jamie and his girlfriend Mary, and tells them they must leave by morning.

That same night, one of the cows goes into labour, but Dan is unable to pull the calf out. Desperate, he goes back to the caravan and asks Jamie for help. Together, they successfully birth the calf. When Dan inspects the calf, it bites him. As thanks for their help, Dan allows Jamie and Mary, who are on the run from her brothers who disapprove of her relationship with a traveller, to stay on his farm.

The next day, Orla returns to inspect the calf and Dan tells her that it bit him. She inspects its mouth and is shocked to find it has fangs. When Orla decides to terminate the calf, its mother aggressively comes to its defence and she is forced to kill them both. She performs a necropsy on the calf and discovers that it was somehow pregnant. She finds six foetuses, all of which are extremely deformed and have their skeletons growing outside their bodies. Dan and Orla argue and fail to notice when one of the foetuses escapes.

The next morning, while feeding one of the cows, Jamie notices several strange wounds on its lower body. When he passes through some shallow water in the barn, something bites him. Shortly after, a police officer arrives at the farm and informs Dan that Orla is missing and her car has been found abandoned nearby. Dan searches his farm and finds her jacket, but no sign of Orla herself.

Later that night, John returns to check on the experiments and learns about the malformed foetuses. While inspecting them, he discovers that their cells are multiplying extremely quickly. Inside their caravan, Mary notices unusual behaviour from Jamie as they have sex. They are later awoken by a creature crawling in their bed, but it escapes. John informs them that the entire farm must be quarantined as the creature can infect other cows and cause a pandemic.

They begin searching for the creature but find that it is hiding in the murky water that is flooding the farm. Dan attempts to force it out of hiding with his tractor, but instead finds Orla's body in the water. John takes her body to the lab and finds foreign material inside a wound on her abdomen. The material displays the same extreme cell growth from before, but now also containing human cells. He realises that humans are also susceptible to infection. Jamie, realising he is infected, attempts to escape, but John kills him. When Dan and Mary come outside to investigate, they find that John has killed almost every cow on the farm in search of the creature. He explains that the creature has been hiding inside the cows like a parasite, eating them from the inside and growing larger.

They go to the barn where the final cow is being kept, but find that the calf has already been born and escaped. A violent arguments breaks out between Dan and John. Mary flees when she sees John murder Dan. John chases her but is attacked and killed by the creature. While attempting to escape, she runs into Dan, who survived the earlier fight with John. They continue searching for the creature and the missing calf. They spot something moving under the floorboards and Mary goes down to investigate. She finds the calf just as new creatures begin rupturing out of its body. She kills it and the newborn creatures. The growing creature from the first calf then appears and attacks her, but Dan creates noise to lure it away. He allows the creature to attack him, creating an opening for Mary to injure the creature with boiling water. The wounded creature flees but Mary chases it down and kills it. She attempts to take Dan with her to find help, but he refuses due to being infected. He dies from his injuries while Mary leaves the farm.

Four months later, in Birmingham, England, a pregnant Mary is assured by her doctor that her baby is healthy. When the ultrasound monitor is shown, a creature-like shape is briefly seen inside the foetus.

Cast 
 Essie Davis as Orla, a vet assisting John
 Marcel Iureș as John, the scientist working with the cattle
 Crispin Letts as the Doctor in St Thomas's Hospital, Birmingham
 John Lynch as Dan, owner of the farm
 Ruth Negga as Mary, Jamie's girlfriend
 Stanley Townsend as Garda Sergeant Tom Hourican
 Sean Harris as Jamie, a traveller, Mary's boyfriend

Reception

Critical response 
Rotten Tomatoes reported the film received 64% positive reviews, with an average score of 6.13/10.

Festivals and awards 
Isolation was screened at Fantastic Fest in September 2006.  It received three awards at the festival: the horror jury awards for best picture and best director Billy O'Brien, and the second-place audience award behind Hatchet.

References

External links

 
 
CFQ Review

2005 films
2005 horror films
2000s monster movies
Biopunk films
English-language Irish films
Films set on farms
Films set in Ireland
Irish horror films
Lionsgate films
Films directed by Billy O'Brien
2000s English-language films